Gurgenidze is a Georgian surname and may refer to:

 Gurgenidze (noble family), princely family in Georgia
 Bukhuti Gurgenidze (1933—2008), Georgian chess grandmaster
 Lado Gurgenidze (born 1970), former Prime Minister of Georgia
 Revaz Gurgenidze (born 1986), Russian acrobatic gymnast

Georgian-language surnames
Surnames of Georgian origin